Dyschirius matisi is a species of ground beetle in the subfamily Scaritinae. It was described by Lafer in 1989.

References

matisi
Beetles described in 1989